Chijioke Onyenegecha (born March 15, 1983 in El Sobrante, California) is a former defensive back who last played for the Edmonton Eskimos in the Canadian Football League.

External links
BlueBombers.com

1983 births
Living people
Canadian football defensive backs
Edmonton Elks players
Oklahoma Sooners football players
People from El Sobrante, Contra Costa County, California
Winnipeg Blue Bombers players